Lu Shao-chuan (born 24 March 1997) is a Taiwanese sports shooter. He competed in the 2014 Summer Youth Olympics, and grabbed the bronze medal in the mixed teams' 10m air rifle event partnered with Viktoriya Sukhorukova of Ukraine. He also competed at the 2014 and 2018 Asian Games. Teamed-up with Lin Ying-shin, they claimed the first gold medal for the Chinese Taipei contingent at the 2018 Games in the mixed 10 metre air rifle team event. He also won the bronze medal in the men's 10 m air rifle event. Lu placed fifth in the 2019 Asian Shooting Championships, and qualified for the 2020 Summer Olympics in Tokyo, becoming the first Taiwanese sports shooter to qualify for the Olympic 10-meter air rifle competition.

References

External links

1997 births
Living people
Taiwanese male sport shooters
ISSF rifle shooters
Shooters at the 2014 Summer Youth Olympics
Shooters at the 2014 Asian Games
Shooters at the 2018 Asian Games
Asian Games gold medalists for Chinese Taipei
Asian Games bronze medalists for Chinese Taipei
Medalists at the 2018 Asian Games
Asian Games medalists in shooting
Shooters at the 2020 Summer Olympics
21st-century Taiwanese people